Scoundrel or Scoundrels may refer to:

Books
 Scoundrel, a 1996 romance novel by Elizabeth Elliott
 Scoundrel (book), a 2022 book by Sarah Weinman
 Scoundrel (novel), a 2004 novel by Bernard Cornwell
 Scoundrels (novel), a 2017 novel by Duncan Crowe and James Peak
 Star Wars: Scoundrels, a 2013 novel by Timothy Zahn

Other uses
 Scoundrels (band), a UK blues-rock band
 "Scoundrels" (Law & Order episode), a 1994 episode of Law & Order
 Scoundrels (TV series), a 2010 comedy-drama TV series on ABC
 The Scoundrels, an American band, formed by members of The Echoes (American group)

See also
 The Scoundrel (disambiguation)
 Dirty Rotten Scoundrels (disambiguation)